Mbulelo Richmond Bara is a South African politician of the Democratic Alliance who has been a permanent delegate to the National Council of Provinces since 23 May 2019. He is a member of the Gauteng provincial delegation. Between 14 November 2016 and 7 May 2019, he served as a member of the National Assembly.

Career

National Assembly
On 14 November 2016, Bara was sworn in as a Member of the National Assembly, replacing Makashule Gana.

He served as a member of the Portfolio Committee on Cooperative Governance and Traditional Affairs between 8 December 2016 and 7 June 2017, when he became a member of the Portfolio Committee on Human Settlements.

He served in the National Assembly until 7 May 2019.

National Council of Provinces
On 22 May 2019, Bara was elected as a permanent delegate to the National Council of Provinces from the Gauteng province. He was sworn into office on 23 May 2019.

In June 2019, Bara became a member of both the Select Committee on Health Social and Services and the  Select Committee on Education and Technology, Sports, Arts and Culture.

References

Living people
Year of birth missing (living people)
People from Gauteng
Democratic Alliance (South Africa) politicians
Members of the National Assembly of South Africa
Members of the National Council of Provinces